Oka or OKA may refer to:

Cars
 Oka (automobile), a small car designed by AvtoVAZ and produced by ZMA and SeAZ
 OKA 4wd, a large 4-wheel-drive vehicle made in Western Australia by OKA

Military
 2B1 Oka, Soviet 420 mm self-propelled mortar
 OTR-23 Oka, a theatre ballistic missile deployed by the Soviet Union

Places
 Oka (Bithynia), a town of ancient Bithynia, now in Turkey
 Oka, Quebec, Canada, a village
 Oka National Park, near Oka, Quebec
 Oka, Akoko, the capital city of Akoko South-West Local Government of Ondo State, Nigeria
 Oka (river), in the European part of Russia
 Oka (Angara), a river in Siberia, Russia
 Oka, West Virginia, United States, an unincorporated community
 Oca (river), in northern Spain, spelled "Oka" in the Basque language

Codes
 Naha Airport, near  Naha, Okinawa, IATA airport code OKA
 Okay Airways, based in Beijing, China, ICAO airline code OKA
 Okanagan language, ISO 639-3 language code oka, spoken in Canada and the United States

Other uses
 Oka (surname), a Japanese surname
 Oka cheese, a Canadian cheese
 Oka (mass), an Ottoman unit of weight equal to 1.2829 kilograms
 16494 Oka, an asteroid
 81-760/761 "Oka", a model of subway car used on the Moscow Metro
 Tropical Storm Oka, a Pacific storm in 1987
 OKA Direct, a British retailer

See also
 Ōka (disambiguation)
 Ōoka (disambiguation)
 Oca (disambiguation)